Lee Jae-su (born 8 March 1968) is a South Korean swimmer. He competed in two events at the 1988 Summer Olympics.

References

External links
 

1968 births
Living people
South Korean male medley swimmers
Olympic swimmers of South Korea
Swimmers at the 1988 Summer Olympics
Place of birth missing (living people)